A common year starting on Wednesday is any non-leap year (a year with 365 days) that begins on Wednesday, 1 January, and ends on Wednesday, 31 December. Its dominical letter hence is E. The most recent year of such kind was 2014, and the next one will be 2025 in the Gregorian calendar or, likewise, 2015 and 2026 in the obsolete Julian calendar, see below for more. This common year is one of the three possible common years in which a century year can begin on, and occurs in century years that yield a remainder of 200 when divided by 400. The most recent such year was 1800 and the next one will be 2200.

Any common year that starts on Wednesday, Friday or Saturday has only one Friday the 13th: the only one in this common year occurs in June. Leap years starting on Tuesday share this characteristic.

In this common year, Martin Luther King Jr. Day is on January 20, Valentine's Day is on a Friday, President's Day is on February 17, Saint Patrick's Day is on Monday, Memorial day is on May 26, Juneteenth is on a Thursday, U.S. Independence Day and Halloween are on a Friday, Labor Day is on its earliest possible date, September 1, Columbus Day is on October 13, Thanksgiving is on November 27, and Christmas is on a Thursday. This is the only type of year in which all dates fall on their respective weekdays 57 times in the 400 year Gregorian Calendar cycle.

Calendars

Applicable years

Gregorian Calendar 
In the (currently used) Gregorian calendar, alongside Sunday, Monday, Friday or Saturday, the fourteen types of year (seven common, seven leap) repeat in a 400-year cycle (20871 weeks). Forty-three common years per cycle or exactly 10.75% start on a Wednesday. The 28-year sub-cycle only spans across century years divisible by 400, e.g. 1600, 2000, and 2400.

400 year cycle

century 1:  3, 14, 25, 31, 42, 53, 59, 70, 81, 87, 98

century 2:  110, 121, 127, 138, 149, 155, 166, 177, 183, 194, 200

century 3:  206, 217, 223, 234, 245, 251, 262, 273, 279, 290

century 4:  302, 313, 319, 330, 341, 347, 358, 369, 375, 386, 397

Julian Calendar 
In the now-obsolete Julian calendar, the fourteen types of year (seven common, seven leap) repeat in a 28-year cycle (1461 weeks). A leap year has two adjoining dominical letters (one for January and February and the other for March to December, as 29 February has no letter). This sequence occurs exactly once within a cycle, and every common letter thrice.

As the Julian calendar repeats after 28 years that means it will also repeat after 700 years, i.e. 25 cycles. The year's position in the cycle is given by the formula ((year + 8) mod 28) + 1). Years 2, 8 and 19 of the cycle are common years beginning on Wednesday. 2017 is year 10 of the cycle. Approximately 10.71% of all years are common years beginning on Wednesday.

References 

Gregorian calendar
Julian calendar
Wednesday